Cadena's tailless bat (Anoura cadenai) is a species of bat native to Colombia. In 2006 it was described as a separate species from the tailed tailless bat species complex.

Taxonomy and etymology
Cadena's tailless bat was described as a new species in 2006. The holotype had been collected between Calima and Restrepo in Colombia. The species was named after Alberto Cadena, curator of the collection of mammals of the Instituto de Ciencias Naturales (Bogota).

Description
Its fur is a blackish-brown color.

Ecology

The ecology of this species is poorly understood due to its recent description. Specimens were recorded at relatively high altitudes (between 800 and 1600m), in habitats of the Andean forest with mature trees covered by epiphytes. This species is sympatric with two other species from the genus Anoura : A. caudifer and A. cultrata.

Range and status

Cadena's tailless bat has only been recorded in the Colombian Andes but it is expected that it is also found in Ecuador. As of 2017, it is evaluated as a data deficient species.

References

Anoura
Mammals of Colombia
Mammals described in 2006
Bats of South America
Endemic fauna of Colombia